Ryūsuke, Ryusuke or Ryuusuke (written: , , ,  or ) is a masculine Japanese given name. Notable people with the name include:

, Japanese film director and screenwriter
, Japanese anime critic and writer
, Japanese baseball player
, Japanese manga artist
, Japanese conductor
, Japanese voice actor
, Japanese footballer
, Japanese footballer
, Japanese professional wrestler

Japanese masculine given names